Rhwydrys is a 6th-century Pre-Congregational Saint of Wales.

He was the son of Rodrem, king of Conacht in Ireland.
Rhwydrys is believed to have built a chapel here around 570AD.

He is commemorated in the St Rhwydrus's Church, Llanrhwydrus, Anglesey island. This church was built in the 12th century on or near his former chapel.

A feast day celebrates his life on 1 November.

References

Welsh Roman Catholic saints
6th-century Christian saints